USS LST-465 was a United States Navy  used in the Asiatic-Pacific Theater during World War II. As with many of her class, the ship was never named. Instead, she was referred to by her hull designation.

Construction
The ship was laid down on 17 December 1942, under Maritime Commission (MARCOM) contract, MC hull 985, by  Kaiser Shipyards, Vancouver, Washington; launched 9 January 1943; and commissioned on 27 February 1943,

Service history
During World War II, LST-465 was assigned to the Asiatic-Pacific theater. She took part in the Bismarck Archipelago operation, the Cape Gloucester, New Britain, landings from December 1943 through February 1944, and the Admiralty Islands landings in March 1944; the Eastern New Guinea operation, the Saidor occupation in February 1944; Hollandia operation in April 1944; the Western New Guinea operations, the Toem-Wakde-Sarmi area operation in May 1944, and the Morotai landing in September 1944; the Leyte operation in October and November 1944; and the Lingayen Gulf landings in January 1945.

Following the war, LST-465 performed occupation duty in the Far East in October and November 1945. Upon her return to the United States, the tank landing ship was decommissioned on 8 March 1946, and struck from the Navy list on 12 April 1946. On 30 September 1947, she was sold to Patapsco Scrap Corp., Baltimore, Maryland, for scrapping.

Honors and awards
LST-465 earned six battle stars for her World War II service.

Notes 

Citations

Bibliography 

Online resources

External links

 

1943 ships
World War II amphibious warfare vessels of the United States
LST-1-class tank landing ships of the United States Navy
S3-M2-K2 ships
Ships built in Vancouver, Washington